The Glasgow Clinical Trials Unit (CTU) is a collaborative research establishment in Glasgow, Scotland. It comprises the Glasgow Clinical Research Facility, the Robertson Centre for Biostatistics and Greater Glasgow and Clyde NHS R&D division.

History
In November 2007 the UKCRN gave the Glasgow Clinical Trials Unit registered Clinical Trials Unit status.

References

External links
 Glasgow Clinical Trials Unit
 NHS Greater Glasgow and Clyde
 The Glasgow Clinical Research Facility
 Robertson Centre for Biostatistics

University of Glasgow
Research institutes in Scotland
Organisations based in Glasgow
Science and technology in Glasgow
2007 establishments in Scotland